Šarūnas Sakalauskas (September 24, 1960 in Kaunas) is a former Lithuanian basketball coach. He was the coach of Sakalai, Lietuvos rytas Vilnius and Eisbären Bremerhaven. During the 2005–06 season he was named Coach of the Year in the German Basketball Bundesliga. In 2010, Sakalauskas was the sports director of Žalgiris Kaunas.

Achievements 
 Lithuanian Basketball League champion – 2000
 Germany Division II league champion – 2005
 German League Coach of the Year – 2006

References
  Lithuanian Basketball League

1960 births
Living people
BC Rytas coaches
Lithuanian basketball coaches